Eyvand or Ivand may refer to:
 Ivand, Lorestan
 Eyvand-e Now, Markazi Province